Črešnjevci (in older sources Črešnjovci) is a dispersed settlement immediately south of Gornja Radgona in northeastern Slovenia.

The Slovene author, linguist and beekeeper Peter Dajnko was born in the village in 1787. The house in which he was born is a simple thatched farmhouse and now houses an ethnographic collection.

References

External links

Črešnjevci on Geopedia

Populated places in the Municipality of Gornja Radgona